San Pedro District may refer to the following places:

Costa Rica
 San Pedro District, Barva, in Barva (canton), Heredia Province
 San Pedro District, Montes de Oca, in Montes de Oca (canton), San José Province
 San Pedro District, Pérez Zeledón, in Pérez Zeledón (canton), San José Province
 San Pedro District, Poás, in Poás (canton), Alajuela Province
 San Pedro District, Santa Bárbara, in Santa Bárbara (canton), Heredia Province
 San Pedro District, Turrubares, in Turrubares (canton), San José Province
 San Pedro District, Sarchí, in Sarchí (canton), Alajuela Province

Paraguay 
 San Pedro District, Paraguay, San Pedro Department

Peru 
 San Pedro District, Canchis, Canchis Province, Cusco Region
 San Pedro District, Lucanas, Lucanas Province, Ayacucho Region
 San Pedro District, Ocros, Ocros Province, Ancash Region
 San Pedro de Cachora District, in Abancay Province, Apurímac Region
 San Pedro de Cajas District, in Tarma Province, Junín Region
 San Pedro de Casta District, in Huarochirí Province, Lima Region
 San Pedro de Chana District, in Huari Province, Ancash Region
 San Pedro de Chaulán District, in Huánuco Province, Huánuco Region
 San Pedro de Chunan District, in Jauja Province, Junín Region
 San Pedro de Coris District, in Churcampa Province, Huancavelica Region
 San Pedro de Huacarpana District, in Chincha Province, Ica Region
 San Pedro de Huancayre District, in Huarochirí Province, Lima Region
 San Pedro de Larcay District, in Sucre Province, Ayacucho Region
 San Pedro de Lloc District, in Pacasmayo Province, La Libertad Region
 San Pedro de Palco District, in Lucanas Province, Ayacucho Region
 San Pedro de Pilas District, in Yauyos Province, Lima Region
 San Pedro de Pillao District, in Daniel Alcides Carrión Province, Pasco Region
 San Pedro de Putina Punco District, in Sandia Province, Puno Region
 San Pedro de Saño District, in Huancayo Province, Junín Region

See also
San Pedro (disambiguation)

District name disambiguation pages